Landolt–Börnstein is a collection of property data in materials science and the closely related fields of chemistry, physics and engineering published by Springer Nature.

History
On July 28, 1882, Dr. Hans Heinrich Landolt and Dr. Richard Börnstein, both professors at the "Landwirtschaftliche Hochschule" (Agricultural College) at Berlin, signed a contract with the publisher Ferdinand Springer on the publication of a collection of tables with physical-chemical data. The title of this book "Physikalisch-chemische Tabellen" (Physical-Chemical Tables) published in 1883 was soon forgotten. Owing to its success the data collection has been known for more than a hundred years by each scientist only as "The Landolt-Börnstein".

1250 copies of the 1st Edition were printed and sold. In 1894, the 2nd Edition was published, in 1905 the 3rd Edition, in 1912 the 4th Edition, and finally in 1923 the 5th Edition. Supplementary volumes of the latter were printed until as late as 1936. New Editions saw changes in large expansion of volumes, number of authors, updated structure, additional tables and coverage of new areas of physics and chemistry.

The 5th Edition was eventually published in 1923, consisting of two volumes and comprising a total of 1,695 pages. Sixty three authors had contributed to it. The growth that had already been noticed in previous editions, continued. It was clear, that "another edition in approximately 10 years" was no solution. A complete conceptual change of the Landolt–Börnstein had thus become necessary. For the meantime supplementary volumes in two-year intervals should be provided to fill in the blanks and add the latest data. The first supplementary volume of the 5th Edition was published in 1927, the second in 1931 and the third in 1935/36. The latter consisted of three sub-volumes with a total of 3,039 pages and contributions from 82 authors.

The 6th Edition (1950) was published in line with the revised general frame. The basic idea was to have four volumes instead of one, each of which was to cover different fields of the Landolt–Börnstein under different editors. Each volume was given a detailed table of contents. Two major restrictions were also imposed. The author of a contribution was asked to choose a "Bestwert" (optimum value) from the mass of statements of an experimental value in the publications of different authors, or derive a "wahrscheinlichster Wert” (most possible value). The other change of importance was that not only diagrams became as important as tables, but that text also became necessary to explain the presented data.

The New Series 
The New Series represents over 520 books published between 1961 and 2018 and includes more than 220,000 pages covering mechanical, optical, acoustical, thermal, spectroscopic, electrical and magnetic properties among others. The New Series offers critically evaluated data by over 1,000 expert authors and editors in materials science.

Landolt-Börnstein Online 
Landolt–Börnstein books have gone through various digitization initiatives, from CD-ROM to FTP and PDF formats. Landolt–Börnstein books content is now available on SpringerMaterials.

Subjects covered by Landolt–Börnstein 

Condensed matter
Nuclear physics
Physical and chemical properties of molecules and radicals
Physical chemistry
Advanced materials
Advanced technologies
Geophysics
Biophysics

External links 
 Landolt–Börnstein Online
 SpringerMaterials
 Springer Nature

Online databases
Materials science
Physics books
Chemistry